J. laeta may refer to:

 Janthina laeta, a violet snail
 Josa laeta, an anyphaenid sac spider